Conrad Francis Dobler (October 1, 1950 – February 13, 2023) was an American professional football player who was a guard in the National Football League (NFL) for ten seasons, primarily with the St. Louis Cardinals. He was selected in the fifth round of the 1972 NFL Draft by the Cardinals, of whom he was a member for six seasons, and later spent two seasons each with the New Orleans Saints and Buffalo Bills. A three-time Pro Bowl selection during his Cardinals tenure, Dobler also achieved notoriety for frequently utilizing unsportsmanlike tactics against opponents, which he openly acknowledged.

NFL

Cardinals
After playing college football at the University of Wyoming, Dobler was selected in the fifth round of the 1972 NFL Draft by the St. Louis Cardinals. He played right offensive guard for the Cardinals from 1972 to 1977, next to hall-of-famer Dan Dierdorf at right tackle. In those years, the Cardinals had solid offensive lines, especially for pass blocking; they allowed just eight sacks in 1975, then a record (though helped by quick releases from quarterback Jim Hart). Dobler was an important cog of this success, making three consecutive Pro Bowl appearances from 1975 to 1977.

Dobler quickly developed a reputation as a nasty player, and he did little to tone down that image. On the contrary, he seemed to revel in it, probably believing that this would intimidate some defensive players, as indicated by the following quote: "I see defensive linemen jump to knock a pass down. When that happened near me, I'd smack 'em in the solar plexus, and that got their hands down real quick." As sportswriter Paul Zimmerman said: "Conrad Dobler was mean dirty. He tried to hurt people in a bad way...he made teams that he played on better. He played hurt, didn't complain, but he was a filthy, filthy player."  He made the cover of Sports Illustrated, who heralded Dobler as "Pro Football's Dirtiest Player".

Saints and Bills
In 1978, the Cardinals traded Dobler to the New Orleans Saints, where he played for two seasons. His final two seasons were with the Buffalo Bills. He retired following the 1981 campaign.

After football
Dobler, known for such transgressions as punching Joe Greene, spitting on a downed and injured  Bill Bergey, and kicking Merlin Olsen in the head, parodied his image in a Miller Lite beer commercial by getting a section of fans to argue about why they drank the beer. Olsen gained a measure of symbolic revenge by placing Dobler's name on a headstone in a scene from Olsen's TV series Father Murphy. NFL Films placed Dobler's conflicts with Bergey as #9 on the NFL Top 10 list of feuds.

Dobler paid a high price for his NFL career,  suffering through numerous operations to repair his battered body. Disabled, Dobler underwent nine knee replacements. Still in need of further surgeries, Dobler, like many other disabled pro football veterans, was  unable to gain disability assistance from the NFL.

On April 5, 2007, The Buffalo News reported that as a result of falling out of a hammock in 2001, Dobler's wife Joy became a paraplegic. Substantial medical bills for Joy's care put the Dobler family in such financial hardship that they could no longer pay for their daughter Holli or their son Stephen to attend college. Champion golfer and philanthropist Phil Mickelson heard of the situation on ESPN and volunteered to pay for Holli's education at Miami University and Stephen's at the University of Kansas. On June 21, 2018, Dobler was enshrined into the National Polish-American Sports Hall of Fame in Troy, Michigan.

Dobler died on February 13, 2023, at the age of 72.

Bibliography

References

External links
Conrad Dobler career statistics

1950 births
2023 deaths
American football offensive guards
Wyoming Cowboys football players
St. Louis Cardinals (football) players
New Orleans Saints players
Buffalo Bills players
National Conference Pro Bowl players
Players of American football from Chicago